Ramón Montesinos Calaf (31 May 1943 – 29 December 2010) was a Spanish footballer who played as a defensive midfielder.

Club career
Born in Barcelona, Catalonia, Montesinos joined local and La Liga powerhouse FC Barcelona in the summer of 1963, having already played his youth football there. During his three-year spell with the club he was sparingly used, his best output being 19 games in precisely his first year, and he was also loaned to CA Osasuna in Segunda División whilst under contract.

In 1965–66, as Barça won the Inter-Cities Fairs Cup, Montesinos appeared more in that competition (eight games) than in the domestic league (six). In 1967, he signed for neighbouring CE Sabadell FC where he would remain for the rest of his professional career, his first five seasons being played in the top flight – this included the 1968–69 campaign where he played all the matches and minutes as the team finished in a best-ever fourth position; at the time of his retirement, he was the Arlequinats' joint-second player with the most appearances in the competition at 141.

Death
Montesinos died in the village of Alella on 29 December 2010, at the age of 67.

Honours
Barcelona
Inter-Cities Fairs Cup: 1965–66

References

External links

1943 births
2010 deaths
Footballers from Barcelona
Spanish footballers
Association football midfielders
La Liga players
Segunda División players
Tercera División players
CD Condal players
FC Barcelona players
Racing de Santander players
CA Osasuna players
CE Sabadell FC footballers
Spain youth international footballers
Spain amateur international footballers
Catalonia international footballers
UE Sants players